Union Sportive de Zilimadjou is a Comorian football club located in Moroni, Comoros.  It currently plays in the Comoros Premier League.

US Zilimadjou is one of the most successful teams in Comoros Premier League history, having won the league 4 times, the most out of any team besides Coin Nord.

Honours
Comoros Premier League: 4
1992–93, 1997–98, 2019–20, 2020–21

Comoros Cup: 1
 1994–95

Stadium
Currently, the team plays at the 3000 person capacity Stade de Moroni.

References

External links
 – Global Sports Archive
List of Comoros Cup Winners - rsssf.com
RSSSF competition history

Football clubs in the Comoros